The Freedom Party is an Egyptian political party. It was founded on 17 July 2011. The party consists of remnants of the formerly dominant National Democratic Party, which was dissolved following the 2011 Egyptian revolution. The party's chairman is Mamdouh Hassan, its secretary general was his brother Moatz Hassan.

Many former NDP MPs joined this party. In the elections for the People's Assembly from November 2011 through January 2012, the Freedom Party won 1.9% of the popular vote and five out of 498 elected seats. The party also gained votes from the Coptic Christian community by placing Copts on the top of their electoral lists.

References

External links
 Official website

Political parties established in 2011
2011 establishments in Egypt
Political parties disestablished in 2012
2012 disestablishments in Egypt